Paul Jaray (Hungarian: Járay Pál; 11 March 1889 – 22 September 1974) was an engineer, designer, and a pioneer of automotive streamlining.

Life

Jaray, of Hungarian-Jewish descent, was born in Vienna. Jaray studied at Maschinenbauschule in Vienna and worked at the Prague Technical University as an assistant to Professor Rudolf Dörfl.

Later he became the chief design engineer for the aircraft building firm Flugzeugbau Friedrichshafen, designing seaplanes. From 1914 Jaray worked at Luftschiffbau Zeppelin, located in the same town, concentrating on streamlining airships. Jaray designed the airship LZ 120 Bodensee on which airships such as the LZ 127 Graf Zeppelin, the LZ 129 Hindenburg and the LZ-130 were later based. Further experiments in LZ's wind tunnel led to his establishment of streamlining principles for car designs. In 1923 he moved permanently to Switzerland, opening an office in Brunnen.

In 1927, Jaray founded the Stromlinien Karosserie Gesellschaft, which presented numerous designs for streamlined car body work. It issued licences to major vehicle manufacturers including Tatra Works in Kopřivnice, Czechoslovakia. Tatra was the only manufacturer that used Jaray's streamlining principles for their car production. Jaray designed his own cars starting with the 1923 Ley and followed on with designs for Chrysler, Mercedes-Benz, Maybach, Apollo, Dixi, Audi, Adler, Jawa, Ford, Steyr and others.

His own 1933 car was built on a Mercedes-Benz chassis with a body by Huber and Bruehwiler of Lucerne. Jaray was also interested in radio and television technology. In 1941 he worked for Farner AG in Grenchen on nosewheel undercarriage design. In 1944 he set up as an independent engineer working on wind-driven power station. He was the author of a large number of technical patents relating to streamlining, air compressors for railway, and devices for handling gases in silencers. Later he lectured at the Eidgenoessische Technische Hochschule (Swiss Federal Institute of Technology), Zürich.

Jaray died in 1974 in St. Gallen.

See also
 Tatra
 Automobile drag coefficient

Notes

External links
BMW Car Designers Paul Jaray in the overview of the BMW automotive designers.

References
 
 
 de Syon, Guillaume: 'The Teardrop that Fell From the Sky: Paul Jaray and Automotive Aerodynamics', ITEA Journal 2008, 29, pp. 14–16

1889 births
1974 deaths
Engineers from Vienna
Austrian Jews
Hungarian automotive engineers
Austrian automobile designers
Hungarian automotive pioneers
Airship designers